Mike Foote is an American politician and a former member of the Colorado House of Representatives who represented District 12 from January 9, 2013, to early 2019. In December 2018, Foote, a Democrat, was selected to fill the vacant State Senate District 17 seat after state senator Matt Jones resigned to become Boulder County Commissioner.

Education
Foote earned his bachelor's degree from Indiana University Bloomington, his MS from the Josef Korbel School of International Studies and his JD from the University of Colorado Law School.

Elections
2012 When incumbent Democratic Representative Matt Jones ran for Colorado Senate and left the District 12 seat open, Foote won the June 26, 2012 Democratic Primary with 3,381 votes (53.7%); and won the three-way November 6, 2012 General election with 27,114 votes (64.5%) against Republican nominee Russ Lyman and Libertarian candidate Matthew Webber.

References

External links
Official page at the Colorado General Assembly
Campaign site
 

Year of birth missing (living people)
Living people
Place of birth missing (living people)
Colorado lawyers
Indiana University Bloomington alumni
Josef Korbel School of International Studies people
Democratic Party members of the Colorado House of Representatives
University of Colorado Law School alumni
21st-century American politicians
Democratic Party Colorado state senators